The fiber pushout test is a mechanical test performed on composite materials where a fiber is mechanically pushed out of the material. This test is carried out with the purpose of measuring the matrix/fiber interface de-bonding energy and the effects of frictional sliding between the matrix and the fiber.

To perform this test flat indentation tips, usually made of diamond or tungsten, are used. These tips are mechanically lowered onto the location of the fiber on the composite using a CCD 

This test is not to be confused with fiber pull-out, which is a composite crack propagation phenomenon.

The mechanics behind the test are as follows:

1. Elastic loading
     The flat tip indenter is lowered onto the fiber using a CCD camera to guide the indenter downwards
2. Progressive de-bonding
    The indenter touches the fiber and begins applying load, bonds begin to break between the matrix and the fiber
3. Fiber push through
    The bonds between the matrix and fiber are totally broken and the fiber begins to slide out of the matrix
4. Interfacial sliding
    the indenter continues to push the fiber through the matrix, the only force resisting this movement is frictional
5. Indenter matrix collision
     The fiber has been totally pushed out of the matrix and the indenter collides with the matrix surface. This gives the total displacement of the fiber.

References 
 Mechanical Behavior of Materials,(2009) Cambridge University Press by M.A. Meyers and K.K. Chawlars, Second Edition, Prentice-Hall, Upper Saddle River, NJ, 1999

External links 
 http://www.seas.harvard.edu/hutchinson/papers/424.pdf
 Article title

Materials testing